Neninthe is a 2008 Indian Telugu-language action drama film written and directed by Puri Jagannadh.
Ravi Teja and Siya Gautam play the lead roles.
Chakri is the music director. Though the film became an Average at the box-office, The film won three Nandi Awards. The movie eventually gained a cult status in Telugu Cinema. The movie is dubbed in Hindi as Ek Aur Vinashak (2009)

Plot
Ravi works as an assistant director and Narayana as co-director for director Idly Viswanath in the Telugu film industry. During the shooting, Ravi meets Sandhya, a group dancer. Sandhya's sister Surekha marries Rambabu, who harasses her only to exploit Sandhya. Ravi narrates an interesting story to the producer, but the latter is not ready to take the risk with a debutant director like Ravi.

Meanwhile, a rich goon Yadu, who usurps prime lands, casts his eyes on Sandhya, and Rambabu tries to make use of this in his favor. At this juncture, Ravi narrates the story to hero Mallik who also expresses his doubts regarding its feasibility. When Ravi pleads for a chance, he agrees for a trial shoot and they seek the help of Sandhya and other friends. Popular director V. V. Vinayak asks Ravi for a heroine. Having seen Sandhya's performance in the trial shoot, he books her.

When Sandhya becomes a heroine, Rambabu ignores Yadu. Mallik, impressed with the trial shoot, convinces the producer. The producer had suffered much loss due to Vishwanath's film. The film shooting begins with Mallik as hero and Sandhya as heroine. At this time, an item dancer Mumaith, who had an affair with Mallik, attempts suicide and is raped. This and the paucity of funds puts the project in trouble. Yadu comes forward to finance the project. Once the shooting is over, Ravi finds his name missing in the titles. Eventually, he teaches Yadu a lesson and replaces the name.

Cast

Soundtrack

The music was composed by Chakri and released by Aditya Music. The song "Oh I Miss You" is based on "Miss You" from Insomniac.

Reception 
Jeevi of Idlebrain.com wrote that "Overall, Neninthe is more like a personal film made from Puri Jagan’s personal experiences". A critic from The Times of India wrote that "Director Puri Jagannath widely covers the opinions of the film fraternity including fans but somewhere lost his way in churning out a money-spinner".

Awards
Nandi Awards - 2008
Best Actor - Ravi Teja
Best Dialogue Writer - Puri Jagannadh
Best Fight Master - Ram-Lakshman

References

External links

2008 films
2000s Telugu-language films
Films scored by Chakri
Films directed by Puri Jagannadh
2008 action drama films
Indian action drama films